Michael Francis Robertson (born October 9, 1970) is an American former Major League Baseball (MLB) first baseman/outfielder who played for the Chicago White Sox, Philadelphia Phillies, and Arizona Diamondbacks from 1996 to 1998.

Biography
A native of Norwich, Connecticut, Robertson attended the University of Southern California, and in 1989 and 1990 he played collegiate summer baseball with the Harwich Mariners of the Cape Cod Baseball League.

Drafted by the Chicago White Sox in the 3rd round of the 1991 Major League Baseball Draft, Robertson would make his Major League Baseball debut with the White Sox on September 6, and appear in his final game on June 26, .

Robertson was a member of the inaugural Arizona Diamondbacks team that began play in Major League Baseball in 1998.

Robertson took a job in the Boston Red Sox front office in 2014 as President of Scouting and Player Development.

References

External links

Venezuelan Professional Baseball League statistics

1970 births
Altoona Curve players
Arizona Diamondbacks players
Baseball players from Connecticut
Birmingham Barons players
Caribes de Oriente players
American expatriate baseball players in Venezuela
Chicago White Sox players
Harwich Mariners players
Living people
Major League Baseball first basemen
Major League Baseball outfielders
Nashville Sounds players
New Orleans Zephyrs players
Philadelphia Phillies players
Richmond Braves players
Sarasota White Sox players
Scranton/Wilkes-Barre Red Barons players
South Bend White Sox players
Tucson Sidewinders players
USC Trojans baseball players
Utica Blue Sox players
Servite High School alumni